The 2009 Paris Masters (also known as the BNP Paribas Masters for sponsorship reasons) was a tennis tournament played on indoor hard courts. It was the 37th edition of the Paris Masters, and was part of the ATP World Tour Masters 1000 of the 2009 ATP Tour. It was held at the Palais omnisports de Paris-Bercy in Paris, France, from 8 November through 15 November 2009.

In singles, the event was notable for hosting the last ATP Tour appearance of the former Number One player Marat Safin. He lost his second round match against Juan Martín del Potro, 4–6, 7–5, 4–6, in what would be his last professional match.

ATP players

Seeds

 Seeds are based on the rankings of 2 November 2009.

Other entrants
The following players received wildcards into the singles main draw:
  Sébastien Grosjean
  Michaël Llodra
  Marat Safin

The following players received entry into the singles main draw as special exempt:
  Marco Chiudinelli

The following players received entry from the qualifying draw:
  Thierry Ascione
  Arnaud Clément
  Alejandro Falla
  David Guez
  Łukasz Kubot
  Vincent Millot

Finals

Singles

 Novak Djokovic defeated  Gaël Monfils 6–2, 5–7, 7–6(7–3)
 It was Djokovic's 5th title of the year and 16th of his career. It was his first win in five Masters Series finals this year, and fifth total Masters 1000 win.

Doubles

 Daniel Nestor /  Nenad Zimonjić defeated  Marcel Granollers /  Tommy Robredo, 6–3, 6–4

References

External links
 Official website
 ATP tournament profile